John Pennington, 1st Baron Muncaster (c. 1740 – 8 October 1813), known as John Pennington until 1783, was a British peer and Tory politician.

Background
Muncaster was the eldest son of Sir Joseph Pennington, 4th Baronet, of Muncaster Castle, Cumberland, and Sarah, daughter of John Moore.

Political career
Muncaster was returned to Parliament as one of two representatives for Milborne Port in 1781, a seat he held until 1796, and then sat for Colchester until 1802. In 1806, he was returned for Westmoreland, and sat for the county until he died in 1813. In 1783, ten years before he succeeded his father in the baronetcy, he was elevated to the Peerage of Ireland as Baron Muncaster, with remainder in default of male issue of his own to his younger brother Lowther Pennington and the heirs male of his body.

Family
Lord Muncaster married Penelope, daughter of James Compton, in 1778. She died in November 1806. Muncaster survived her by seven years and died in October 1813. He had no sons and was succeeded in the baronetcy and barony (in the barony according to the special remainder) by his younger brother, Lowther.

References

1813 deaths
Barons in the Peerage of Ireland
Peers of Ireland created by George III
Year of birth uncertain
Members of the Parliament of Great Britain for English constituencies
British MPs 1780–1784
British MPs 1784–1790
British MPs 1790–1796
British MPs 1796–1800
Members of the Parliament of the United Kingdom for English constituencies
UK MPs 1801–1802
UK MPs 1806–1807
UK MPs 1807–1812
UK MPs 1812–1818